Conley House may refer to:

* John D. Conley House, a two-story Victorian dwelling of wooden frame construction in Laramie, WY, listed on the NRHP in Wyoming
 Sanford F. Conley House, an ornate eighteenth century residence in Columbia, MO, listed on the NRHP in Missouri